The Oriental shrew (Crocidura orientalis) is a species of mammal in the family Soricidae. It is endemic to Indonesia.

References

 Insectivore Specialist Group 1996.  Crocidura orientalis.   2006 IUCN Red List of Threatened Species.   Downloaded on 30 July 2007.

Crocidura
Mammals of Indonesia
Mammals described in 1890
Taxonomy articles created by Polbot